Phyllis Hudecki is an American educator from Oklahoma. Hudecki was appointed by Governor of Oklahoma Mary Fallin to serve as her Secretary of Education. As Secretary, Hudecki oversees all aspects of elementary and secondary education, vocational education and higher education for the State.

Biography
Originally from Morris, Oklahoma, Hudecki received her bachelor's degree and doctorate degree from Oklahoma State University. She received an educational specialist degree in education administration from the University of Missouri-Kansas City and a master's degree in education from the University of Connecticut.

Hudecki began her career in education as a teacher in Norwich, Connecticut and  served as an assistant principal at a technical high school in Kansas City, Missouri. She has held various positions with Iowa, Missouri and Massachusetts state departments of education and with the United States Department of Education in Washington, D.C.  In 1991, Hudecki joined the University of California-Berkeley as an associate director of the National Center for Research in Vocational Education.

Hudecki joined the Oklahoma Business and Education Coalition (OBEC) as that organization's Executive Director. OBEC is an organization supported by CEO's from 30 business across Oklahoma that develop policies to improve education in the State.  Many of these policies have focused on establishing state curriculum standards, reviewing state tests and evaluating the State's education accountability policy.

On November 23, 2010, Governor-elect Mary Fallin announced that she will nominate Hudecki to serve as Oklahoma Secretary of Education. Her appointment will require confirmation by the Oklahoma Senate.

References
Governor-elect Mary Fallin Selects Phyllis Hudecki as Secretary of Education, Office of Governor-elect Mary Fallin, 11-23-10
Fallin Names Education Secretary, Tulsa World, by Barbara Hoberock, 11-23-10

External links
Official biography from the Oklahoma Business and Education Coalition

Year of birth missing (living people)
Living people
State cabinet secretaries of Oklahoma
Oklahoma State University alumni
University of Connecticut alumni
People from Morris, Oklahoma
University of California, Berkeley staff